Hosanna is a 1973 play by French-Canadian writer Michel Tremblay. The story takes place in the Montreal, Quebec apartment of Hosanna, a drag queen dressed as Elizabeth Taylor's Cleopatra, and centres on the relationship between her and Cuirette, an aging "stud" and gay biker, after they have returned from a Halloween party. It became the first Canadian play about and starring a drag queen when it was performed at Théâtre de Quat'Sous in Montreal in 1973.

The play deals with several issues including gender identity, sexual identity, the ignorance and acceptance of ageing, and social expressions of homosexuality. Hosanna discusses her relationship with her mother and shows her anxieties over her knowledge of who she really is.  The scholar and activist Viviane Namaste has criticized Hosanna, which ends with its protagonist identifying as a gay man after a series of humiliations, as reinforcing a patriarchal, transphobic ideology in which a "reliance on the ideas of illusion, deception, and betrayal presupposes that we as transgendered people do not know who we are. [...] It is through such a violently anti-transgendered discourse that Tremblay enables gay male subject-positions."

The play was translated into English by John Van Burek and Bill Glassco.

Hosanna was first performed at le Théâtre de Quat'sous in Montreal, Quebec, on 10 May 1973. Hosanna was first performed in English at Tarragon Theatre in Toronto, Ontario, on 15 May 1974. Hosanna then appeared on Broadway in New York City at the Bijou Theatre on 14 October 1974.

A Tron Theatre production of a translation of the play into contemporary Scots by Bill Findlay and Martin Bowman was staged as part of Glasgow Mayfest in 1991.

References

1973 plays
Canadian LGBT-related plays
Transgender-related theatre
Plays set in Montreal
Plays by Michel Tremblay
Canadian plays adapted into films
1970s LGBT literature